Eric Kendall Bowden (30 September 1871 – 13 February 1931) was an Australian politician. A solicitor by profession, he served as Minister for Defence from 1923 to 1925, under Prime Minister Stanley Bruce. He was a member of the House of Representatives from 1906 to 1910 and 1919 to 1929.

Early life

Bowden was born in Parramatta, New South Wales, the second son of Sarah Anne (née Smith) and John Ebenezer Bowden. His great-grandfather Thomas Bowden had arrived in the colony in 1812 and became one of Parramatta's earliest schoolmasters. Educated at Newington College (1882-1884) and Sydney Boys High School (1888–92), Bowden qualified as a solicitor in 1894 after serving articles with his father. Four years he later married Reinetta May Murphy. In 1902, he took possession of Endrim, a former clergy house previously owned by his father. It is now heritage listed.

Political career
Bowden was an alderman on the Granville Borough Council from 1904 to 1907. He was elected to federal parliament at the 1906 federal election, aged 34, winning the newly created Division of Nepean for the Anti-Socialist Party. He was defeated in 1910 after a single term, losing to the Australian Labor Party (ALP) candidate George Cann.

At the 1919 election, Bowden recaptured Nepean as a Nationalist, replacing the retiring member Richard Orchard. He switched to the Division of Parramatta at the 1922 election.

Minister for Defence

Stanley Bruce replaced Billy Hughes as prime minister in February 1923, and appointed Bowden as Minister for Defence in the new ministry. His appointment occasioned some surprise, as he had no military experience, was not regarded as a strong speaker, and had shown little interest in defence matters.

In 1923, Bowden oversaw the passage of the Air Force Act 1923, the major governing act for the Royal Australian Air Force (RAAF) that had been established two years earlier. He also oversaw the introduction of the government's five-year defence programme, which provided for the creation of a cruiser and submarine force. He argued for greater funding for defence to counter the perceived threat of Japan, but also allowed a reduction in funding for the military and naval colleges.

Bowden resigned from the ministry in January 1925, citing ill health.

Final years
In his last terms in parliament, Bowden served on the joint select committee on electoral law and as a member of the royal commission into the Constitution. He lost his seat at the 1929 election, which saw Labor return to government.

Bowden suffered from chronic respiratory disease in his last years and was also in financial difficulties, forcing him to subdivide the land around Endrim. He died suddenly on 13 February 1931 at his home in Parramatta.

References

1871 births
1931 deaths
Members of the Australian House of Representatives
Members of the Australian House of Representatives for Nepean
Members of the Australian House of Representatives for Parramatta
People educated at Newington College
Australian Methodists
Nationalist Party of Australia members of the Parliament of Australia
Free Trade Party members of the Parliament of Australia
Commonwealth Liberal Party members of the Parliament of Australia
Defence ministers of Australia
20th-century Australian politicians